Miguel Ángel Lauri, known in France as Michel Lauri (August 29, 1908 – September 26, 1994) was a footballer, he played for Estudiantes de La Plata. Born in Argentina and of French descent, Lauri represented both the Argentina national football team, and France national football team.

Career
Lauri made his debut for Estudiantes in 1928 during the amateur era of Argentine football. He made his debut for the Argentina national team in 1929.

In the early 1930s, after the professionalisation of the Argentine game, Lauri was part of the famous Estudiantes attacking lineup known as Los Profesores (The Professors). He earned the nickname Flecha de Oro (Golden Arrow) for his powerful right footed shooting ability.

Lauri made an appearance in the 1933 film Los tres berretines (The Three Whims), a comedy about a family obsessed with football, tango and cinema.

In 1935 Lauri played in the Copa América where he scored his only goal for the national team, they eventually lost in the final to Uruguay.

In 1937 Lauri was signed by French club Sochaux-Montbéliard, he was part of the French league winning campaign of 1938.

Lauri played one game for the France A side in 1937 making him one of only four Argentines to play for France.

In 1939 with the Second World War looming Lauri left France and returned to South America, where he played for Peñarol in Uruguay.

Titles

References

Sources
 Coll. L'intégrale de l'équipe de France de football, Paris, First, 1998, p. 100 and 453
 
 Profile at French federation official website 

1908 births
1994 deaths
Sportspeople from Buenos Aires Province
Argentine footballers
Argentina international footballers
French footballers
France international footballers
Association football midfielders
Association football forwards
Argentine people of French descent
Argentine people of Basque descent
Argentine people of Italian descent
French people of Argentine descent
Sportspeople of Argentine descent
French people of Basque descent
French people of Italian descent
Dual internationalists (football)
Estudiantes de La Plata footballers
FC Sochaux-Montbéliard players
Ligue 1 players
Peñarol players
Expatriate footballers in Uruguay
Argentine expatriate footballers
Argentine expatriate sportspeople in France
Argentine football managers
Estudiantes de La Plata managers